David McWalter (1891 – 2 February 1918) was a Scottish professional footballer who played in the Scottish League for Johnstone as an outside right.

Personal life 
McWalter served as a gunner in the Royal Field Artillery during the First World War and was killed in action during the Salonika Campaign on 2 February 1918. He was buried in Sarigol Military Cemetery, near Kristoni, Greece.

References

External link 

 

1891 births
1918 deaths
British Army personnel of World War I
British military personnel killed in World War I
Royal Field Artillery soldiers
Scottish Football League players
Luncarty F.C. players
Scottish footballers
Footballers from Perth and Kinross
St Johnstone F.C. players
Association football outside forwards
Johnstone F.C. players